Yuqorichirchiq is a district of Tashkent Region in Uzbekistan. The capital lies at the town Yangibozor. The district consists of 4 urban-type settlements (Yangibozor, Mirobod, Xitoy Tepa) and 9 rural communities (Oqovul, Arganchi, Bordonkoʻl, Jambul, Sakson ota, Navroʻz, Istiqlol, Surnkent, Tinchlik).

References

Districts of Uzbekistan
Tashkent Region